Villanova Solaro is a comune (municipality) in the Province of Cuneo in the Italian region Piedmont, located about  south of Turin and about  north of Cuneo.

The municipality of Villanova Solaro contains the frazioni (subdivisions, mainly villages and hamlets) Vernetto and Airali.

Villanova Solaro borders the following municipalities: Moretta, Murello, Ruffia, Scarnafigi, and Torre San Giorgio.

Demographic evolution

References

Cities and towns in Piedmont